"The Calusari" is the twenty-first episode of the second season of the American science fiction television series The X-Files. It originally aired on the Fox network on April 14, 1995. It was written by Sara B. Charno and directed by Michael Vejar. "The Căluşari" is a "Monster-of-the-Week" story, unconnected to the series' wider mythology, or fictional history. It earned a Nielsen household rating of 8.3, being watched by 7.9 million households in its initial broadcast. Due to perceived inconsistencies in the plot, "The Căluşari" received mixed reviews from television critics.

The show centers on FBI special agents Fox Mulder (David Duchovny) and Dana Scully (Gillian Anderson) who work on cases linked to the paranormal, called X-Files. In this episode, a photograph taken just before the death of a two-year-old boy yields evidence of some supernatural intervention which piques Mulder and Scully's curiosity. When another death in the family occurs, the grandmother of the remaining child requests the aid of some Romanian ritualists, named the Calusari, in order to cleanse the home of evil.

The script for "The Calusari" was inspired by Charno's experience as a doctor of Eastern medicine. The inspiration for the entry came from an idea series creator Chris Carter had involving someone getting hanged with a garage-door opener. Because "The Calusari" was heavy in terms of violence, Fox's standards and practices department took issues with several scenes. In addition, Carter re-cut the episode after it was completed in order to make it scarier.

Plot 

In Murray, Virginia, Maggie and Steve Holvey's' family visits a local amusement park. When the youngest child, Teddy, lets his balloon fly away, his father, Steve, gives him the balloon that belongs to his older brother, Charlie (Joel Palmer). When the boys' mother, Maggie (Helene Clarkson), is in the bathroom, the strap in Teddy's stroller comes undone. Teddy follows the balloon floating under its own power out of the restroom and onto the tracks of the park's tour train, leading to him getting killed by the train. Charlie is the only member of the Holvey family not to grieve Teddy's death at the scene.

Three months later, Fox Mulder (David Duchovny) shows Dana Scully (Gillian Anderson) a photo taken moments before Teddy's death. Mulder points out that a balloon does not stay close to the ground, nor does it blow sideways. After taking the photo to a lab, it is shown that a mysterious, electromagnetic force taking the form of a child was dragging the balloon. Mulder and Scully later visit the Holveys, and Mulder explains his seemingly asinine theory that Teddy was lured onto the tracks by some unseen force. As the Holveys push back against this idea, Scully notices an older woman (Lilyan Chauvin), who is Maggie's elderly Romanian mother named Golda, drawing a swastika on the boy's hand. Scully hypothesizes that the Holvey children may be victims of Munchausen by proxy, perpetrated by their grandmother.

Soon thereafter, Mulder and Scully later discuss the case with Steve. Eventually, the topic of the conversation turns to Golda. Steve notes that she was vehemently opposed to his marrying Maggie. However, she moved in with the couple after Teddy was born after a series of odd occurrences began to take place. Given all that has happened, as well as the possibility that Charlie is being abused, Scully recommends a social worker named Karen Kosseff (Christine Willes). Later, Steve and Charlie decide to attend one of Kosseff's sessions, but when Steve tries to open the garage door, it won't cooperate. After grabbing a ladder to examine the door's controls, his tie is caught in the door and he is strangled to death. Investigating Steve's death, the police find dead chickens in Golda's room: evidence of the ritualistic sacrifices. In the garage, Mulder discovers a layer of vibhuti—a sort of ash created by intense spiritual energy.

Later, Golda welcomes three elderly Căluşari mystics into her room and they begin to conduct a ritual. While this is going on, Kosseff shows up at the Holveys' house and asks to meet with Charlie. Suddenly the boy begins to convulse. After noticing smoke billowing out from under Golda's door, Kosseff and Maggie then burst into her room where she and the Căluşari mystics are performing a ritual. Maggie tries to stop it, dismissing the mystics, but Golda refuses to comply; she grabs Charlie, locks her door, and attempts to finish the ritual. Suddenly, Charlie brings a pair of sacrificed chickens back to life and they kill Golda. While this is going on, Kosseff rushes off and finds Mulder, who in turn questions the Căluşari mystics. They explain that they were attempting to stop "an ancient and unrelenting evil" with their ritual. Kosseff later sits Charlie down and inquires about the struggle, but the boy swears that it was not him in his grandmother's room, but rather another boy named "Michael". Maggie later tells Mulder and Scully that Michael was the name of Charlie's twin brother who was a stillborn. Terrified, she insists that she and Steve never told Charlie. After Charlie was born, Golda tried to perform a ritual that would have separated the spirits of the two boys. However, Steve would not allow it.

Charlie seizes again and is taken to a hospital. However, Michael convinces Maggie, by pretending to be Charlie, that he wants to go home. Scully witnesses what is happening, and informs Mulder, who is certain that the spirit of Michael, and not Charlie, is killing people. The two agents split up: Mulder tracks down the Căluşari mystics to complete the ritual, and Scully goes to Maggie's home to protect her. After an intense struggle in which Michael very nearly kills Scully and Maggie, Mulder and the Căluşari complete the ritual, which causes Michael's spirit to disappear. Maggie returns to the hospital and is reunited with Charlie. Before the agents leave, the head elder of the Căluşari says it is over for the time being and cautiously forewarns Mulder that "it knows you."

Production

The episode was written by Sara Charno and directed by Mike Vejar. Before becoming a writer, Charno had been a doctor of Eastern medicine, and so her "esoteric knowledge that none of the rest of [the writers] had about all kinds of things" was put to use in this script, according to writer Frank Spotnitz. The episode was based largely on an idea that series creator Chris Carter had had about a "garage-door opener hanging". Christine Willes, who plays the part of Agent Kosseff, reprises her role; she originally appeared in the earlier episode "Irresistible".

During production of the episode, the producers "agonized" over both the teaser (given that it revolves around a child being killed by a tram) and the episode's over-all bleakness. Fox's standards and practices department, on the other hand, took issues with the initial cut of Steve's strangulation scene; in the end, the sequence was kept but the actor's face was obscured to "soften the impact". Although the episode's filming went along smoothly, the final cut "didn't pass muster". Spotnitz explained that Carter "spent a lot of time in the editing room trying to figure out how to make this more terrifying." Spotnitz later noted that Carter's dedication proved that something could be so "much better ... if you didn't give up."

Broadcast and reception 

"The Calusari" originally aired on the Fox network on April 14, 1995, and was first broadcast in the United Kingdom on BBC One on February 6, 1996. The episode earned a Nielsen household rating of 8.3 with a 16 share, meaning that roughly 8.3 percent of all television-equipped households, and 16 percent of households watching TV, were tuned in to the episode. A total of 7.9 million households watched this episode during its original airing. "The Calusari" is the only episode of the series to have received an explicit rating of "18" in the United Kingdom by the BBFC for "occasional strong horror" and themes involving "demonic possession". Because of this one episode, any collected box sets of the entire series sold in the UK are rated as such.

"The Calusari" received mixed reviews, with critics citing inconsistencies in the plot as the main detractions. Entertainment Weekly gave the episode a "B−" rating, calling it "an Exorcist/Omen rip-off, but a classy one". Emily VanDerWerff of The A.V. Club gave it a "C+", writing that it was "an episode with a lot of great and spooky moments", but "a messy, chaotic story that could have been much better developed, and too many things that happen [...] just because the writers thought it would be cool if they happened". However, while she was "not sure everything hangs together" and wished for more backstory, VanDerWerff did praise some "really great moments", particularly the opening teaser. John Keegan from Critical Myth, while calling the episode "a mixed bag", awarded it a 7 out of 10. He praised the entry's "fascinating implications [about] the mythology hidden within the events depicted", and noted that it was "well directed and acted". Despite this, he was more critical of the episode's plot and wrote that there were "clear logical flaws [...] and the subject matter can be disturbing. This is an episode that falls heavily to subjective interpretation." Robert Shearman and Lars Pearson, in their book Wanting to Believe: A Critical Guide to The X-Files, Millennium & The Lone Gunmen, gave the episode a largely negative review and rated it one-and-a-half stars out of five. The two called it a "pale retread of The Exorcist" and noted that many of the episode's elements, like the chicken-sacrificing grandmother and the Calusari members, were "tremendously crass". Shearman and Pearson, however, did enjoy the episode's dialogue, praising one scene in particular where the spirit of Michael torments his mother by asking to be taken to the amusement park and ride the train that killed his younger brother. Regardless, however, the duo concluded that "there's something stale and pointless at [the episode's] heart." The plot for "The Calusari" was also adapted as a novel for young adults in 1997 by Garth Nix.

Footnotes

Bibliography

External links 

"The Calusari" on TheXFiles.com

Novelization

1995 American television episodes
Television episodes about exorcism
Television episodes about ghosts
Television episodes set in Maryland
The X-Files (season 2) episodes
Television episodes set in Virginia
Works about child death